Eleven people ran as independent candidates in the 1988 Manitoba general election, none of whom was elected. Information about these candidates may be found on this page.

Michael Ambrose Kibzey (Burrows)

Kibzey received 129 votes (1.75%), finishing fourth against Liberal candidate William Chornopyski. He died in 1997, at age 76.

Bill Seman (Concordia)

Seman received 358 votes (3.65%), finishing fourth against New Democratic Party leader and later Premier Gary Doer.

Footnotes

1988